Ergoteles (Έργοτέλης) was a Greek potter, active in Athens around the middle of the 6th century BC. He was the son of the famous potter Nearchos and the brother of Tleson.
Three signed Little-master cups by him are known:
 Berlin, Antikensammlung  F 1758
 Florence, arts trade
 Oxford, Ashmolean Museum G 1004

Bibliography 
 John Beazley: Attic Black-Figure Vase-Painters, Oxford 1956, p. 162.
  Künstlerlexikon der Antike I, München, Leipzig 2001, p. 213-214 s.v. Ergoteles (Rolf Blatter)

External links

 Ergoteles in the Beazley Archive

Ancient Greek potters
Artists of ancient Attica
6th-century BC Athenians